Bialik College is an independent  comprehensive co-educational early learning, primary and secondary Jewish day school, located in the Melbourne suburb of Hawthorn East, Victoria, Australia.  Established in 1942 in Carlton North, Victoria, the school has had a Zionist orientation since its inception, with the establishment of the State of Israel central to its identity. Bialik's approach to Judaism is pluralistic and cross-communal.

School capacity is more than 1,000 students, ranging from Creche to Year 12, with day care for children from three months to three years. Bialik offers the Victorian Certificate of Education (VCE).

Facilities 
Bialik is currently building a new centre for Science, Launch Lab, scheduled to open in 2023.

Since the late 1990s, Bialik has added a building to house its VCE department, an Early Learning Centre, the 'Besen Family Art & Technology Centre' and the 'Gringlas Sports Centre' to its campus. Additionally, the school has established the Rosenkranz Centre For Excellence and Achievement, aimed at providing enrichment and extension programs for students.

A new drama studio opened in 2010 and the Evelyn Hellen Library opened in early 2011. In 2011, a new Jewish Life Centre, The Mifgash, opened as part of the school's new Jewish Life and Informal Education initiative.

Academics 
Bialik College has offered the VCE since 1990; the school has consistently been ranked as one of the top 10 in Victoria. , the school has been ranked in the top 5 in Victoria for 25 out of 26 years.

House system 
The three houses, Weizmann (Green), Szold (Yellow) and Herzl (Red), are mainly used for interhouse sports and are named for Chaim Weizmann, Henrietta Szold and Theodor Herzl.

Sport 
Bialik is a member of the Eastern Independent Schools of Melbourne (EISM).

Notable alumni 
Josh Frydenberg, Australian politician who was the Treasurer of Australia and Deputy Leader of the Liberal Party from 2018 to 2022
 Anthony Goldbloom, founder and CEO of Kaggle
Ben Zygier, an Australian-Israeli citizen who was a veteran of the Israel Defense Forces and allegedly an agent of Mossad.

See also

 Judaism in Australia
 Reform Judaism
 List of non-government schools in Victoria

References

External link

Eastern Independent Schools of Melbourne
Educational institutions established in 1942
Jewish day schools
Jewish schools in Melbourne
1942 establishments in Australia
Buildings and structures in the City of Boroondara